Faqirabad may refer to:
 Faqirabad, Kerman
 Faqirabad, Khash, Sistan and Baluchestan Province

See also
 Faqeerabad, Peshawar, Pakistan
 Fakhrabad (disambiguation)